1997 Emperor's Cup Final was the 77th final of the Emperor's Cup competition. The final was played at National Stadium in Tokyo on January 1, 1998. Kashima Antlers won the championship.

Overview
Kashima Antlers won their 1st title, by defeating Yokohama Flügels 3–0 with Tadatoshi Masuda, Mazinho and Atsushi Yanagisawa goal.

Match details

See also
1997 Emperor's Cup

References

Emperor's Cup
1997 in Japanese football
Kashima Antlers matches
Yokohama Flügels matches